The Indriidae (sometimes incorrectly spelled Indridae) are a family of strepsirrhine primates. They are medium- to large-sized lemurs, with only four teeth in the toothcomb instead of the usual six. Indriids, like all lemurs, live exclusively on the island of Madagascar.

Classification

The 19 living species in the family are divided into three genera.

Family Indriidae
Genus Indri
Indri, Indri indri
Genus Avahi, woolly lemurs
Bemaraha woolly lemur, Avahi cleesei
Eastern woolly lemur, Avahi laniger
Moore's woolly lemur, Avahi mooreorum
Western woolly lemur, Avahi occidentalis
Sambirano woolly lemur, Avahi unicolor
Peyrieras's woolly lemur, Avahi peyrierasi
Southern woolly lemur, Avahi meridionalis
Ramanantsoavana's woolly lemur, Avahi ramanantsoavani
Betsileo woolly lemur, Avahi betsileo
Genus Propithecus, sifakas
Propithecus diadema group
Diademed sifaka, Propithecus diadema
Silky sifaka, Propithecus candidus
Milne-Edwards's sifaka, Propithecus edwardsi
Perrier's sifaka, Propithecus perrieri
Golden-crowned sifaka, Propithecus tattersalli
Propithecus verreauxi group
Verreaux's sifaka, Propithecus verreauxi
Coquerel's sifaka, Propithecus coquereli
Decken's sifaka, Propithecus deckenii
Crowned sifaka, Propithecus coronatus

Characteristics
The 10 extant Indriidae species vary considerably in size. Not counting the length of their tails, the avahis are only  in length, while the indri is the largest extant strepsirrhine. The tail of the indri is only a stub, while avahi and the sifaka tails are as long as their bodies. Their fur is long and mostly from whitish over reddish up to grey. Their black faces, however, are always bald. The hind legs are longer than their fore limbs, their hands are long and thin, and their thumbs cannot be opposed to the other fingers correctly.

All species are arboreal, though they do come to the ground occasionally. When on the ground, they stand upright and move with short hops forward, with their arms held high. In the trees, though, they can make extraordinary leaps and are extremely agile, able to change direction from tree to tree. Like most leaf eaters, they adjust for the low nutrient content of their food by long rests. Often, they can be seen lying stretched on trees sunning themselves. Indriidae live together in family federations up to 15 animals, communicating with roars and facial expressions.

Indriidae are herbivores, eating mostly leaves, fruits, and flowers. Like some other herbivores, they have a large cecum, containing bacteria that ferment cellulose, allowing for more efficient digestion of plant matter. They have fewer premolar teeth than other lemurs, with the dental formula of: 

Females and males usually mate monogamously for many years. Mostly at the end of the dry season, their four- to five-month gestation ends with the birth of a single offspring, which lives in the family for a while after its weaning (at the age of five to six months).

See also
 Holocene extinction event

References

Lemurs
Folivores
Primate families
Taxa named by Gilbert Thomas Burnett
Taxa described in 1821